{{Automatic_taxobox 
| image = StanulusTalbotiRLS.jpg
| image_caption = Stanulus talboti
| taxon = Stanulus
| authority = J. L. B. Smith, 1959
| type_species = Stanulus seychellensis
| type_species_authority = J.L.B. Smith, 1959
}}Stanulus is a genus of combtooth blennies found in the Pacific and Indian Oceans.

Species
The currently recognized species in this genus are:

 Stanulus seychellensis J. L. B. Smith, 1959 (Seychelle's blenny)
 Stanulus talboti'' V. G. Springer, 1968 (Talbot's blenny)

References

 
Salarinae
Taxa named by J. L. B. Smith
Marine fish genera